Het Gulden Cabinet vande Edel Vry Schilder-Const or The Golden Cabinet of the Noble Liberal Art of Painting is a book by the 17th-century Flemish notary and rederijker Cornelis de Bie published in Antwerp.  Written in the Dutch language, it contains artist biographies and panegyrics with engraved portraits of 16th- and 17th-century artists, predominantly from the Habsburg Netherlands.  The work is a very important source of information on the artists it describes.  It formed the principal source of information for later art historians such as Arnold Houbraken and Jacob Campo Weyerman.  It was published in 1662, although the work also mentions 1661 as date of publication.

Background
Het Gulden Cabinet stands in a long tradition of artist biographies. This tradition goes back to Pliny and was revived during the Renaissance.  In 1550, the Italian Giorgio Vasari published his Vite on the lives of famous artists. Karel van Mander was the first author to introduce this genre in the Dutch language with his Schilder-boeck of 1604.  Cornelis de Bie explicitly placed himself in the tradition of van Mander and did what van Mander did for 15th and 16th Netherlandish artists for 17th-century artists.

In his Het Gulden Cabinet, de Bie presents himself as a rederijker whose duty it is to broadcast the fame of the artists.  By doing so he followed an existing tradition already seen in Dominicus Lampsonius' 1572 Pictorum aliquot celebrium Germaniae Inferioris effigies and the Antwerp painter and rederijker Alexander van Fornenbergh's 1658 Antwerpschen Proteus ofte Cyclopschen Apelles, which sang the praises of the painter Quinten Matsys.

The concept of Het Gulden Cabinet did not come from Cornelis de Bie himself, but from the Antwerp printer Joannes Meyssens.  In 1649 Meyssens had already published Image de divers hommes, which contained engraved portraits of famous men, including painters, in imitation of Anthony van Dyck's Iconography.  Most of the artist portraits in Het Gulden Cabinet are taken from this Image de divers hommes and only a few new engravings were made especially for de Bie's work.

The work

General
The full title of the work is Het gulden cabinet vande edel vry schilder const: inhoudende den lof vande vermarste schilders, architecten, beldthouwers ende plaetsnyders, van dese eeuw, which translates as The Golden Cabinet of the Noble Liberal Art of Painting: Containing the Praise of the Most Famous Painters, Architects, Sculptors and Engravers of This Century.  Despite its title, the book also deals with artists from the 16th century.

The work was dedicated to the Antwerp art collector Antoon van Leyen who had provided some of the information for the book and may also have helped finance the publication.  Other persons who had provided information on contemporary artists included de Bie’s own father, Erasmus Quellinus II, Luigi Primo and Hendrick ter Brugghen’s son Richard.

Structure and style
The book has three parts. The first deals with artists who had died before de Bie's time and relies heavily on van Mander's Schilder-boeck. The second part deals with artists living at the time of de Bie and is mostly based on original research by de Bie and on the comments added to the engravings borrowed from Meyssens' Image de divers hommes. The third part deals with artists who had been omitted in the first two parts and also includes engravers, sculptors, architects, and painters.  A general treatise on the art of painting is woven into the entire work.

The book is mainly written in verse, some of them in Latin, and is as a result rather difficult to read today.  There are also some prose sections.  It is over 500 pages long and contains engravings of more than 50 painters derived mainly from Meyssens' earlier work.

Influence
While The Gulden Cabinet never gained the level of popularity of van Mander’s Schilder-boeck, it is an important source of information on Flemish artists of the 17th century.  De Bie’s most important contribution was to provide a theoretical basis for his appreciation of (then) less valued painting genres such as still lifes, genre painting, portraits and landscapes.  He unreservedly praised the artists who practised in these genres.
 
Het Gulden Cabinet is included in the Basic Library of the Digital Library for Dutch Literature, which contains 1000 works of Dutch-language literature from the Middle Ages to today, which are deemed by its compilers to be of particular importance to Dutch-language literature.

Second edition
De Bie seems to have planned a second edition of the work, but this was never published.  The hand-written manuscript of de Bie is still extant and is kept at the Royal Library of Belgium.  The manuscript is dated 1672.  In it de Bie mentioned his intention to have a second edition published.  The reason why the second edition was never published is unclear.  It may have been due to the fact that the publisher and promoter of the first edition Joannes Meyssens had died in 1670 and de Bie had difficulty finding another publisher.

Historical reliability
Like Vasari and Van Mander before him, de Bie's biographies are interspersed with amusing anecdotes. Although such literary motifs belong to a long rhetorical tradition, many of these stories were labelled "historically unreliable" by leading historians in the 19th century.  Only recently have some of the stories been reinstated.  Since the book was often the only surviving source of information on certain painters, these stories have often been repeated as hard facts about the lives of the painters described.

For instance, Cornelis de Bie postulates certain apprenticeships, which are now considered improbable because the pupil painted in a completely different genre than the teacher.  De Bie's statement that Philips Wouwerman trained with Frans Hals was deemed implausible by later historians since Wouwerman painted landscapes with horses and Hals was principally a portrait painter. Some scholars still consider this apprenticeship as unlikely, but in view of Hals' large workshop it cannot be entirely excluded.

Artists in Het Gulden Cabinet, Part I
The engraved portraits included as illustrations in Book I are below, followed by the artists listed in order of appearance in the text. The first illustration is of Antoon van Leyen, to whom the book is dedicated.

 Adam van Noort	p 37
 Otto van Veen	p 39
 Abraham Bloemaert	p 45
 Tobias Verhaeght	p 47
 Adam Elsheimer	p 49
 Guido Reni	p 52
 Petrus Paulus Rubens	p 57
 Frans Snyders	p 61
 Guiliam Nieulandt	p 63
 Abraham Janssens	p 65
 Anthony van Dyck	p 75
 Gillis Mostaert	p 79
 Pieter Brueghel	p 89
 Adriaen Brouwer	p 91
 Gerard Seghers	p 97
 Lodewijk de Vadder	p 98
 Wenceslas Cobergher	p 101
 Jan Antonisz. van Ravesteyn	p 102
 Palamedes Palamedesz. (I)	p 102
 Michiel van Mierevelt	p 103
 Cornelis Schut	p 103
 Jan Snellinck	p 104
 Cornelis de Vos	p 104
 Orazio Gentileschi	p 105
 Andries van Eertvelt	p 105
 Adriaen van Utrecht	p 106
 Willem Backereel	p 108
 Gilles Backereel	p 108
 Jan de Wael I	p 108
 Joos van Craesbeeck	p 109
 Abraham Matthys	p 110
 Adam Willaerts	p 111
 Jean Guiliam Bouwer	p 113
 Nikolaus Knüpfer	p 115
 Jan van Bijlert	p 117
 Jan van Balen	p 119
 Roelant Savery	p 125

 Johannes Parcelis	p 126
 Jan Wildens	p 126
 Hendrik vander Borght the elder	p 127
 Jacob de Backer	p 129
 Paulus Moreelse	p 131
 Hendrick ter Brugghen	p 132
 Deodat del Monte	p 133
 Peter vande Plas	p 139
 Jacques Blanchard	p 139
 David Teniers the Elder	p 140
 David de Haen	p 142
 Vincent Malo	p 143
 Franciscus Perreer	p 143
 Jan van Hoeck	p 143
 Augustijn Brun	p 145
 Hans Holsman	p 145
 Frederick Brentel	p 145
 Jacob van der Heyden	p 145
 Hesselien (Crabbeken van Amsterdam)	p 145
 Peeter Meulenaer	p 145
 Raphael Coxie (son of Michiel)	p 145
 Spanjolet 	p 145
 Gillis Peeters	p 145
 Adriaen van Nieulandt the younger	p 146
 Remigius van Rheni p 149
 Peeter van Loon	p 149
 Padovanino	p 150
 Lucas Franchois the Younger	p 152
 Peter Franchois	p 152
 Peter Soutemans	p 154
 Pieter Neefs I	p 155
 Dirck van Baburen	p 155
 Jan Both	p 156
 Pietro Testa	p 158
 Christoffel Jacob vander Laenen	p 159
 David Beck	p 160
 Nicolaes vander Horst	p 162

 Johann Matthias Kager	p 162
 Theodor Rombouts	p 163
 Henrick de Clerck	p 163
 Anthoni Salart	p 163
 Gerrit van Honthorst	p 164
 Thomas Willeborts Bossaert	p 166
 Daniel van Alsloot	p 168
 Jacques Focquier	p 168
 Guiliam Mahue	p 168
 Pieter van Laer	p 169
 Bonaventura Peeters	p 171
 Franciscus Wouters	p 174
 Hendrik Andriessens	p 176

Artists in Het Gulden Cabinet, Part II
The engraved portraits included as illustrations in Book II are below, followed by the artists listed in order of appearance in the text. Book II begins on page 181.

 Daniel Seghers	p 213
 Jan Davidsz. de Heem	p 216
 Peter Snayers	p 220
 Jacob van Es	p 227
 Adriaan van Stalbemt	p 228
 Lucas de Wael	p 229
 Cornelis de Wael	p 229
 Adriaan de Bie	p 231
 Adriaen van de Venne	p 235
 Paul de Vos	p 236
 Simon de Vos	p 237
 Jacques Jordaens	p 238
 Lucas van Uden	p 240
 Theodoor van Thulden	p 241
 Justus Sustermans	p 242
 Johannes Lievens	p 243
 Simon Vouet	p 243
 Gaspar de Crayer	p 244
 Pieter Jansz. Saenredam	p 246
 Abraham Willaerts	p 247
 Jan Thomas van Ieperen	p 247
 Balthasar Gerbier	p 248
 Salomon Koninck	p 250
 Justus van Egmont	p 251
 Carolus Creten	p 251
 Leonardus Bramer	p 252
 Jan van Bockhorst	p 254
 François Eyckens	p 255
 Jan Eyckens	p 255
 Peter vander Borght	p 255
 Cornelis Poulenbourgh	p 257
 Ostadi	p 258
 Herman Swaenvelt	p 259
 Hans Haringh	p 259
 Erasmus Quellinus II	p 260
 Claude Lorrain	p 265
 Johannes Cossiers	p 266
 David Bally	p 271
 Philippe de Champaigne	p 273
 Alexander Andriaensen	p 273
 Herman Saftleven	p 275
 Jacob Sandraet	p 276
 Gerrit Dou	p 277
 Jan Weenix	p 277
 Jan van Bronckhorst	p 278
 Goovaert Flinck	p 280
 Pietro da Cortona	p 280
 Dirk van Delen	p 281
 Francesco Maltese	p 282
 Bartholomeus Vander Elst	p 283
 Jean Francisco Datsent	p 283
 Abraham van Diepenbeeck	p 284
 Giovanni Francesco Romanelli	p 286
 Andreas Vacar	p 297

 Nicolas Poussin	p 297
 Peter Danckerse de Ry	p 288
 Rembrandt	p 290
 Peeter van Aelst	p 291
 Albaen	p 291
 Daniel van Heil	p 292
 Cavailler Calabres	p 294
 Giardino di Fiori	p 295
 Gaspar Du Que	p 295
 Andrea Sacchi	p 296
 Bibiano	p 296
 Michelangelo delle Battaglie	p 297
 Cornelis Janssens	p 298
 Jacques d'Arthois	p 300
 Salvator Rosa	p 303
 De Colonnen	p 304
 Jan Benedetti Castilion	p 305
 Hoscof	p 305
 Peter van Lint	p 306
 David Ryckaert	p 308
 Monsieur Hans	p 311
 Bernar	p 311
 Pierre Patel	p 311
 Nicolaes de Helt Stocade	p 312
 Karel van Mander III	p 314
 Dominiquin	p 315
 Gonzales Coques	p 316
 Cavailler Massimo	p 319
 Charles Le Brun	p 319
 Luigi Primo	p 320
 La Hiere	p 327
 Peter Tysens	p 328
 Lanfranck	p 330
 Sébastien Bourdon	p 333
 David Teniers	p 334
 Johannes Fyt	p 339
 Robert van Hoeck	p 340
 Jan Baptiste van Heil	p 342
 Jan Philip van Thielen	p 344
 Maria Theresa van Thielen	p 347
 Anna Maria van Thielen	p 347
 Françoise Catharina van Thielen	p 347
 Johannes Coeper	p 348
 Franciscus de Neve	p 349
 Pieter Meert	p 350
 Anthonius Rocka	p 353
 Jan Peeters (I)	p 354
 Peter Boel	p 362
 Johannes van Heck	p 365
 Gaspar van Eyck	p 367
 Jan Meel	p 368
 Cornelis de Heem	p 369
 Johannes de Duyts	p 370
 Jan Sibrechts	p 373

 Joris van Schooten	p 373
 Lucas Franchois	p 374
 Karel Dujardin	p 377
 Carel van Savoyen	p 378
 Peter van Bredael	p 380
 Hendrik van der Borcht II	p 382
 Peter Tentenier	p 384
 Gysbrecht de Hondecoten	p 384
 Peter Lely	p 385
 Cornelis van Berchom	p 385
 Jan Meyssens	p 386
 Nicolaes van Eyck	p 388
 Philippus Fruytiers	p 389
 Antonius Goebouw	p 390
 Peter de Witte	p 393
 Gaspar de Witte	p 394
 Joris van Son	p 402
 Frans van Mieris the Elder	p 404
 Franciscus Verwilt	p 405
 Jan Baptist van Deynum	p 406
 Johannes van Kessel	p 409
 Gysbrecht Thys	p 412
 Martin Ryckaert p 413
 Artus Wolffort p 413
 Geeraert van Hoochstadt p 413
 Guiliam de Vos p 413
 Maarten Pepyn p 413
 Hendrik Berckmans	p 414

Artists in Het Gulden Cabinet, Part III
The engraved portraits included as illustrations in Book III are below, followed by the artists listed in order of appearance in the text. Book III begins on page 419.

 François Duquesnoy	p 442
 Bernini	p 445
 Cornelis Danckerts de Ry	p 446
 Johannes van Milder	p 448
 Huybrecht vanden Eynden	p 449
 Cornelis Cort	p 450
 Theodorus Galle	p 452
 Lucas Vorstermans the Elder	p 453
 Dirck Coornhert	p 454
 Andreas Colyns de Nole	p 456
 Carolus de Malleri	p 456
 Robertus van Voors	p 457
 Hendrik de Keyser	p 458
 Claes Jansz. Visscher	p 461 (see note p 524)
 Jan Sadeler	p 462
 Raphael Sadeler	p 464
 Jacobus de Breuck	p 472
 Jan Witdoeck	p 473
 Nicolaes Lauwers	p 473
 Jacobus Matham	p 474
 Boetius Adams Bolswert	p 476
 Schelte Adams Bolswert	p 476
 Johannes Baptista Barbe	p 477
 Jacques Francquaert	p 478
 Cornelis Galle the Elder	p 480
 Cornelius Galle the Younger	p 480
 Jeremias Valck	p 481
 Claude Melan	p 481
 Egidius Sadeler	p 482
 Cornelis Bloemaert	p 485
 Mattheus Mereaen	p 485
 Hendricus Hondius	p 486
 Egidius Rousselet	p 490

 Robert Nantuel	p 491
 Nicolaes Loyer	p 491
 Pieter de Jode I	p 492
 Jan Cardon	p 494
 Jean Le Potre	p 495
 Paulus Pontius	p 496
 Johannes Saenredam	p 498
 Lanfan	p 499
 Lucas Faydherbe	p 500
 Michiel Lane	p 502
 Alexander del Garde	p 503
 Artus Quellinus	p 504
 Michiel Natalis	p 507
 Bertholet Flemael	p 507
 Abraham Bosse	p 508
 Perelle	p 509
 Gerard van Opstal	p 509
 Pieter de Jode II	p 510
 Sebastiaen de Neve	p 512
 M Koesel	p 512
 Guiliam Gabron	p 517
 Charles Emanuel Biset	p 518
 Johannes Wierix	p 520
 Jeronimus Wierix	p 520
 Anthonius Wierix	p 520
 Charles Erpard	p 520
 François Polly	p 521
 Nicolaes Polly	p 521
 Jacques Callot	p 522
 Leo van Heil	p 526
 Lenaert van Orley	p 528
 Theodor Matham	p 528
 Peter vander Willighe	p 529

 Peeter Verbruggen	p 530
 Nicolas Pitau	p 532
 Jacobus Pitau	p 532
 Johannes van der Borght	p 532
 Villamena	p 533
 Simon Bosboom	p 546
 Peeter van Schuppen	p 548
 Francesco Fanelli	p 549
 Wenceslaus Hollar	p 550
 Franciscus vander Steen	p 552
 Lucas Vorsterman the Younger	p 553
 Jacobus Neefs	p 553
 Artus Quellinus II	p 554
 Franciscus Du Sart	p 556
 Anna Schuermans	p 557
 Catharina Peeters	p 558
 Johanna Vergouwen p 558
 Stephanus de la Belle	p 560
 Coenrard Lauwers	p 562

Notes

References 
 Digital version of the work on Google Books
 Digital version of the work on Erfgoedbibliotheek Hendrik Conscience
 G. Lemmens, "Introduction", in: Cornelis de Bie, Het Gulden Cabinet, Soest, 1971, p. 1-15 (reprint).
 Ch. Schuckman, "Did Hendrick ter Brugghen revisit Italy? Notes from an unknown manuscript by Cornelis de Bie." in: Hoogsteder-Naumann Mercury, 4 (1986), 7-22.
 P. Calu, "Tot verheffinghe der vermaerste Gheesten ende Lief-hebbers der Schildry. Literaire aspecten van Het Gulden Cabinet (1662) van Cornelis de Bie." in: "Spiegel der Letteren", 53 (1), 29-59.

1662 books
Biographies about artists
Art history books
Flemish literature
Cornelis de Bie
Dutch biographical dictionaries